Bjoernstadia kasuluensis is a moth in the family Cossidae, and the only species in the genus Bjoernstadia. It is found in the Albertine Rift region of Tanzania.

References

Natural History Museum Lepidoptera generic names catalog

Endemic fauna of Tanzania
Metarbelinae
Moths described in 2012